Marjorie Browne (1910–1990) was a British musical theatre actress who made occasional films.

Her West End appearances included the original productions of Cole Porter's Wake Up and Dream at the London Pavilion in 1929; Stanley Lupino's  musical Sporting Love at the Gaiety in 1934; and as Marjanah in the revival of Chu Chin Chow at the Palace in 1940.

Filmography
 Lassie from Lancashire (1938)
 Laugh It Off (1940)
 I Didn't Do It (1945)

References

External links

1910 births
1990 deaths
British stage actresses
British film actresses
English musical theatre actresses
20th-century British actresses
20th-century English women
20th-century English people